Udo Z. Karzi (born June 12, 1970, in Liwa, Lampung) is an Indonesian writer.

Education
He graduated from the Department of Government Science at the Faculty of Social Sciences and Political Science (FISIP) of Lampung University in 1996.

Journalism
He was the chief editor of student newspaper Teknokra (1993-1994), the general leader of the magazine Republica (1994-1996), and advisor to the magazine Ijtihad (1995-1998).

He has been a member and administrator of the Alliance of Independent Journalists (AJI) in Lampung since its establishment on March 31, 2001.

He became a freelance reporter for the Lampung Post, Bandar Lampung (1995-1996), and a reporter for the weekly news magazine Sinar in Jakarta (1997-1998).

He worked as a lecturer in economics and accounting at a senior high school in his hometown (1998) before returning to journalism in roles at the Sumatera Post, Bandar Lampung (1998-2000), Lampung Post, Bandar Lampung (2000-2006), Borneo News, Pangkalan Bun (2006-2008), back to Lampung Post (2009-2015), and since 2015 at the newspaper Fajar Sumatera, Bandar Lampung.

Cultural work
He was chairman of the board of research and development of Lampung Art Council (R & D DKL) (2005-2006). In 2010, with Y. Wibowo and Nugroho Este, he established the publisher Pustaka Labrak, as well as being the editor at BE Press, Bandar Lampung (since 2007).

Awards
 His book of poetry, Mak Dawah Mak Dibingi (BE Press, 2007) won the 2008 Rancage Literary Award for Lampung literature.
 Won the 2014 Kamaroeddin Award from Alliance of Independent Journalists (AJI) Bandar Lampung
 His novel, Negarabatin (Pustaka LaBRAK, 2016) won the 2017 Rancage Literary Award for Lampung literature.

Selected publications
 Etos Kita: Moralitas Kaum Intelektual (editor, Teknokra & Gama Media, 2002) 
 Teknokra: Jejak Langkah Pers Mahasiswa (editor with Budisantoso Budiman, Teknokra-Pustaka LaBRAK, 2010) 
 Mamak Kenut: Orang Lampung Punya Celoteh (Indepth Publishing, 2012), 
 Feodalisme Modern: Wacana Kritis tentang Lampung dan Kelampungan (Indepth Publishing, 2013).
 Tumi Mit Kota (with Elly Dharmawanti, Pustaka Labrak, 2013),
 Dari Oedin ke Ridho: Kado 100 Hari Pemerintah M Ridho Ficardo-Bachtiar Basri (editor, Indepth Publishing, 2014)
 Menulis Asyik (Sai Wawai Publishing, 2014)
 Rumah Berwarna Kunyit (editor, Pustaka LaBRAK & Aura Publishing, 2015)
 Ke Negarabatin Mamak Kenut Kembali (Pustaka LaBRAK, 2016)
 Ngupi Pai: Sesobek Kecil Ulun Lampung (Pustaka LaBRAK, 2019)
 Lunik-Lunik Cabi Lunik: Cerita-Cerita Buntak Gawoh (Pustaka LaBRAK, 2019)
 Setiwang (pooms, Pustaka LaBRAK, 2020)
 Jejak-jejak Literer: Bibliografi Sastra Lampung (1960-2020) (Pustaka LaBRAK, 2021)
 Negarabatin, Negeri di Balik Bukit (novel, Pustaka Jaya, 2022)

Studies of his work
 Kuswinarto. Udo Z. Karzi dalam Peta Puisi (Berbahasa) Lampung. (2003)
 Ritanti Aji Cahyaningrum. Zulkarnain Zubairi dan Kelampungannya. (2006)
 Melsa Hendralia. Analisis Nilai-nilai Budaya Lampung dalam Kumpulan Sajak Mak Dawah Mak Dibingi karya Udo Z. Karzi dan Implikasinya dalam Pembelajaran di Sekolah Menengah Atas. (thesis STKIP Muhammadiyah Kotabumi Lampung, 2010)

References 

 Danardana, Agus Sri, et al. 2008. Ensiklopedi Sastra Lampung. Kantor Bahasa Provinsi Lampung, Bandarlampung.

1970 births
Indonesian writers
20th-century Indonesian poets
Living people
People from Lampung
Lampung people
Indonesian male poets
20th-century male writers